The canton of Saint-Nazaire-1 is an administrative division of the Loire-Atlantique department, western France. It was created at the French canton reorganisation which came into effect in March 2015. Its seat is in Saint-Nazaire.

It consists of the following communes:
Saint-Nazaire (partly)

References

Cantons of Loire-Atlantique